Horace Smith (31 October 1892 – 6 April 1977) was an Australian cricketer. He played six first-class matches for Tasmania between 1913 and 1928.

See also
 List of Tasmanian representative cricketers

References

External links
 

1892 births
1977 deaths
Australian cricketers
Tasmania cricketers
Cricketers from Hobart